Mart may refer to:

 Mart, or marketplace, a location where people regularly gather for the purchase and sale of provisions, livestock, and other goods
 Mart (broadcaster), a local broadcasting station in Amsterdam
 Mart (given name)
 Mart., taxonomic author abbreviation for Carl Friedrich Philipp von Martius (1794–1868), German botanist
 Mart (Syriac), Syriac title for women saints
 Mart, Texas, a community in the United States
 Data mart, an approach to handling big data

Abbreviations
 Museum of Modern and Contemporary Art of Trento and Rovereto, a museum in Italy
 Mississippi Aerial River Transit, a demolished gondola lift in New Orleans, Louisiana
 Montachusett Regional Transit Authority
 Multiple Additive Regression Trees, a commercial name of gradient boosting

See also
 Kmart
 Walmart
 Mard (disambiguation)